Giovanni "Gianni" Meccia (born 2 June 1931, in Ferrara, Italy) is an Italian actor, composer, and singer. He is usually associated with Jimmy Fontana.

Filmography

Actor 
 Nel blu dipinto di blu (1959)
 Ragazzi del Juke-Box (1959)
 Urlatori alla sbarra (1960)
 Io bacio... tu baci (1961)
 Diciottenni al sole (1962)
 Canzoni in... bikini (1963) 
 Djurado (1969)

Composer 
 Io bacio... tu baci (1961, "Diavolo",  "Patatina") 
 La Ragazza con la valigia (1961, "Folle banderuola") 
 Sentivano uno strano, eccitante, pericoloso puzzo di dollari (1973)

Singer 
 Io bacio... tu baci (1961, "Patatina" and "Cha cha cha dell'impiccato")
 L'Amore difficile (1962, "Sole magico di luglio")

External links
 

Italian male actors
Italian composers
Italian male composers
Italian male singers
1931 births
Living people